The Northeast Liberation Front (FLNE or FLNe) was a Brazilian revolutionary group established in 1971 in Pernambuco and Ceará, uniting ex-members of the Aliança Libertadora Nacional (ALN) and the  Vanguarda Armada Revolucionária Palmares (VAR-Palmares).

References

Paramilitary organisations based in Brazil
Military history of Brazil
Military units and formations established in 1971
Guerrilla movements in Latin America